In molecular biology, the glycoside hydrolase family 53 is a family of glycoside hydrolases.

Glycoside hydrolases  are a widespread group of enzymes that hydrolyse the glycosidic bond between two or more carbohydrates, or between a carbohydrate and a non-carbohydrate moiety. A classification system for glycoside hydrolases, based on sequence similarity, has led to the definition of >100 different families. This classification is available on the CAZy web site, and also discussed at CAZypedia, an online encyclopedia of carbohydrate active enzymes.

These enzymes are endo-1,4- beta-galactanases . The structure of this domain is known  and has a TIM barrel fold.

References

EC 3.2.1
GH family
Protein families